United for Valencia (UxV) is a Valencian political party initially founded as an electoral alliance in 2007 by elements from Valencian Union—namely, the Valencian Nationalist Option and Valencian Nationalist Left.

In 2013, they promoted the "Centre Democràtic Valencià." The aim was to create a reformist and democratic political party. It was presented later on, as the "Demòcrates Valencians".

References

Political parties in the Valencian Community
Political parties established in 2007